Tishby is a surname. Notable people with the surname include:

 Naftali Tishby (1953–2021), professor of computer science and computational neuroscientist 
 Noa Tishby (born 1977), Israeli actress